Şükran Güldal Mumcu (born 20 September 1951) is a Turkish politician.

Early life
She was born to Süreyya and his spouse Emine Necla in Denizli, Turkey on 20 September 1951. She graduated from Ankara College and Faculty of Political Sciences of Ankara University.

Between 1975–1979, she served in the State Investment Bank of Turkey. On 19 July 1976, she married Uğur Mumcu, a renowned investigative journalist. The next year, she gave birth to their son Özgür, and in 1984 to their daughter Özge. Uğur Mumcu was assassinated on 24 January 1993. The next year, Güldal Mumcu established a foundation of journalism named after her husband. One of the books the foundation published was her book İçimden Geçen Zamen ("The Time Passes Through Me"), which was about her life after Uğur Mumcu's assassination.

Political career
In the elections held in 2007, she got elected to the parliament as a deputy of İzmir Province from the Republican People's Party (CHP). On the 10 August 2007 Mumcu and Meral Akşener were elected as Vice Speakers of the Grand National Assembly. After Nermin Neftçi in the 1970s, they became the first women to hold this post. She continued up to 2015. On 1 February 2010, she accused Deputy Prime Minister Bülent Arınç, who tried to interfere her conduct while managing a session. She said that the executive can not control the Legislature.

References

Living people
1951 births
People from Denizli
TED Ankara College Foundation Schools alumni
Ankara University Faculty of Political Sciences alumni
21st-century Turkish women politicians
Republican People's Party (Turkey) politicians
Members of the 23rd Parliament of Turkey
Members of the 24th Parliament of Turkey
Deputy Speakers of the Grand National Assembly of Turkey
Turkish autobiographers